Daniel Nicholas Robinson (March 9, 1937 – September 17, 2018) was an American psychologist who was a professor of psychology at Georgetown University and later in his life became a fellow of the faculty of philosophy at Oxford University.

Career 
Robinson published in a wide variety of subjects, including moral philosophy, the philosophy of psychology, legal philosophy, the philosophy of the mind, intellectual history, legal history, and the history of psychology. He  held academic positions at Amherst College, Georgetown University, Princeton University, and Columbia University. In addition, he served as the principal consultant to PBS and the BBC for their award-winning series "The Brain" and "The Mind", and he lectured for The Great Courses' series on Philosophy. He was on the Board of Consulting Scholars of Princeton University's James Madison Program in American Ideals and Institutions and was a Senior Fellow of BYU's Wheatley Institution. In 2011, he received the Gittler Award from the American Psychological Association for significant contributions to the philosophical foundations of Psychology.

Primary interests 
Robinson’s interests ranged over the brain sciences, philosophy, law and intellectual history. Several of his works were illustrative of these interests. Regarded as a classic in its field, his An Intellectual History of Psychology was praised by Ernest Hilgard for its “…development of ideas as they provide alternative perspectives on the nature of mind…The reader is carried along on a genuine intellectual adventure."
Robinson’s enduring interest in Aristotle’s thought was summarized in Aristotle’s Psychology, which Deborah Modrak described as “Easy to read and informative” predicting that it would “no doubt prompt readers to reflect on the relevance of Aristotle’s work to modern psychology…” (International Studies in Philosophy, Volume 23, Issue 3, 1991; pp. 142–143). In this connection, Robinson was among the small group assembled by Martin Seligman in 1999 to develop the framework for Positive Psychology.

In Wild Beasts and Idle Humours, Robinson offered a treatise on the relationship between science and jurisprudence as this developed from ancient to contemporary times.  Michael Perlin describes the book as “truly unique. It synthesizes material that I do not believe has ever been considered in this context, and links up the historical past with contemporaneous values and politics. Robinson effortlessly weaves religious history, literary history, medical history, and political history, and demonstrates how the insanity defense cannot be fully understood without consideration of all these sources.”   Robert Kinscherff states that it “…reads like the inner workings of a fascinating and disciplined narrative mind.”

Robinson’s major work in moral philosophy was Praise and Blame: Moral Realism and Its Application. Reviewing the book in Review of  Metaphysics, Jude P. Dougherty writes, “The richness of this work cannot be comprehended in one reading.  Whether the reader agrees or not with the author, one has much to learn from the profundity of Robinson's insight into the framing of moral judgment”.  (Rev. Metaphys., 2003, vol. 56, 899-900.)

Central to Robinson’s concerns were the conceptual and philosophical foundations of psychology and related subjects.   Of Robinson’s Philosophy of Psychology, William Dray wrote that “this highly readable book squarely addresses fundamental metaphysical, epistemological and methodological problems…His clear and informed treatment…offers salutary challenge to much conventional wisdom on the nature and prospects of psychological science.”

Selected published works 
Books

 
 
 
 Eccles, John C. and Robinson, Daniel N. (1984). The Wonder of Being Human: Our Brain and Our Mind. New York, N.Y.:  Free Press. 
 
 
 Robinson, Daniel N., ed. (1998) The Mind. Oxford [UK]: Oxford Univ. Press. 
 
 
 
Articles
 
 
 
 

 
 
 
 
 
 
 
 
 Robinson Daniel.“On the evident, the self-evident and the (merely) observed”.American Journal of Jurisprudence, 2002, vol 47, pp. 197–210.
 
 
 
 

Video Lectures / Podcasts

 On Kant's Critique of Pure Reason

See also 
 American philosophy
 List of American philosophers

References 

1937 births
2018 deaths
20th-century American philosophers
21st-century American philosophers
American philosophy academics
City University of New York alumni
Colgate University alumni
Columbia University faculty
Georgetown University faculty
Historians of psychology
Moral realists
People from Middletown, Maryland
Philosophers of law
Philosophers of mind
Philosophy writers
Princeton University faculty